The 2006 AFC Women's Asian Cup was a women's football tournament for women's national teams from countries affiliated to the Asian Football Confederation. It was the 15th installment of the AFC Women's Asian Cup.

Unlike the previous tournament which was held every two years, the tournament was moved back a year to 2006. The structure of the competition changed for this tournament, with a qualifying tournament and a separate championship tournament.

The four qualifiers of the sub-tournament (Vietnam, Chinese Taipei, Myanmar, Thailand) went on to compete for the Championship proper against the four automatic finalists (China, Japan, South Korea and North Korea). Australia were added to the final tournament following their switch from Oceania Football Confederation to the Asian confederation. The finals of the tournament were held in Australia in July 2006 - the hosting rights were originally given to Japan, but after Australia moved conferences, they were given the hosting rights. All matches in the main tournament were held in Adelaide.

The tournament also acted as Asia's qualifying tournament for the 2007 Women's World Cup. Two spots were available in addition to the automatic spot given to China as World Cup hosts. China won the tournament, beating hosts Australia in the final. Thus, Australia took the first qualifying spot, while North Korea defeated Japan in the third place play-off to take second place. Despite beating China in the group stages, Japan then played off with the third-placed team in the CONCACAF region, Mexico, who they beat over two legs to qualify for the tournament.

Qualification

Teams 
Japan, China, North Korea and South Korea qualified by virtue of occupying the four top spots in the 2003 AFC Women's Championship.

Venues 
The tournament was held in Adelaide, South Australia, with Hindmarsh Stadium being the main venue, hosting all matches except for one of the two concurrent last matches in each of the two groups, which were held at Marden Sports Complex.

Group stage 
All matches in the group stage were held at Hindmarsh Stadium, except the Chinese Taipei v Vietnam and Thailand v Australia matches, which took place at Marden Sports Complex.

Group A

Group B

Knockout stages

Semi-finals 
Winners qualify for the 2007 Women's World Cup.

In the China v North Korea match, China conceded a potential equaliser in injury time, but it was disallowed for offside. The North Koreans reacted by throwing bottles and other objects at the referees, and North Korean goalkeeper Han Hye-yong kicked Italian referee Anna De Toni from behind. Three North Korean players, including Han, were suspended before the third place play-off. North Korea protested the decision, demanding a rematch and a reversal of the suspensions.

Third place match 
As China were automatically qualified as hosts, North Korea qualified for the World Cup as the third-placed team in the tournament. Japan will play off with the third-placed team from the 2006 Women's Gold Cup in the CONCACAF region.

Final

Awards

Goalscorers

Tournament teams ranking

References

External links 
 Official site from AFC
 WomenSoccer.com report
 ThaiFootball.com story
 News article on tournament set up
 Results on RSSSF

 
2006
Women's Championship
Afc
2006
AFC
2006–07 in Australian women's soccer
2006 in Japanese women's football
2006 in Chinese football
2006 in North Korean football
2006 in South Korean football
2006 in Burmese football
2006 in Thai football
2006 in Vietnamese football
2006 in Taiwanese football
July 2006 sports events in Asia